German Township is one of eight townships in Vanderburgh County, Indiana, United States.  As of the 2010 census, its population was 7,441 and it contained 2,909 housing units.

German Township was organized in 1845.

Geography

Cities and towns
 Darmstadt (far west edge)

Unincorporated towns
 Kasson
 Saint Joseph

Adjacent townships
 Vanderburgh County
 Armstrong Township (North)
 Scott Township (Northeast)
 Center Township (East)
 Perry Township (South)
 Posey County
 Robinson Township (West)
 Marrs Township (Single Point)

Cemeteries
The township contains these cemeteries: Higinbottom, Huber, Richter, Saint Peters, St. Joseph, and St. Paul's.

School districts
 Evansville-Vanderburgh School Corporation

Political districts
 Indiana's 8th congressional district
 State House District 75
 State Senate District 50

References
 
 United States Census Bureau 2007 TIGER/Line Shapefiles
 IndianaMap

External links

Townships in Vanderburgh County, Indiana
Townships in Indiana